Anna Maria Orel (11 December 1996) is an Estonian hammer thrower.

Orel represented Estonia at the 2013 World Youth Championships, 2014 World Junior Championships and 2015 European Junior Championships, but was always eliminated in the qualifying round. She improved the Estonian junior record several times in 2015, finishing with 62.32 m. In 2016, she set two Estonian under-23 records (66.06 m and 66.44 m) and then threw 67.52 m in Lapinlahti on June 19, breaking her training partner Kati Ojaloo's outright Estonian record of 67.26 m.

Orel is coached by Finnish hammer coach Jarmo Pöyry.

Competition record

References

External links 

1996 births
Living people
Estonian female hammer throwers
People from Jõhvi
World Athletics Championships athletes for Estonia